Luciano Foschi (born 3 July 1967) is an Italian football manager and former player, currently in charge of  club Lecco.

Playing career
As a player, Foschi made his debut in the 1985-1986 football season as a defender for S.S. Lazio. He played then for the most of his career in Serie C2, winning two championships with A.C. Crevalcore in 1994 and with Viterbese in 1999.

Coaching career
As a coach, he won a Serie D championship with Olbia Calcio in 2002 and gained a promotion to Serie C1 with Novara Calcio in 2003. He lately trained U.S. Alessandria in Lega Pro Seconda Divisione 2008–09 and in Lega Pro Prima Divisione 2009–10.

He was dismissed by Livorno on 8 April 2018.

On 4 June 2018, he was appointed as a manager of Ravenna. He was dismissed by Ravenna on 28 June 2020.

On 21 January 2021 he was named new head coach of Carpi. On 11 February 2021 he resigned himself.

On 21 September 2022 he was confirmed new head coach of Serie C club Lecco.

References

External links
 Luciano Foschi coach profile at TuttoCalciatori.net 
 

1967 births
Living people
People from Albano Laziale
Italian footballers
Italian football managers
S.S. Lazio players
Rimini F.C. 1912 players
Olbia Calcio 1905 players
Calcio Lecco 1912 players
U.S. Cremonese players
A.C. Ancona managers
Novara F.C. managers
Teramo Calcio managers
A.C. Reggiana 1919 managers
Ravenna F.C. managers
U.S. Livorno 1915 managers
Calcio Lecco 1912 managers
S.S.D. Castel San Pietro Terme Calcio players
Virtus Bergamo Alzano Seriate 1909 players
Association football defenders
Footballers from Lazio
Sportspeople from the Metropolitan City of Rome Capital